The Preston Monument is a stone marker that shows the tri-point (the place where three states meet) of Oklahoma, Colorado, and New Mexico. It is named after Levi S. Preston, who surveyed a portion of the New Mexico–Colorado border.

It is an elevation of 4,444 feet.

See also
 List of Oklahoma tri-points
 Four Corners Monument: monument on the Arizona-Colorado-New Mexico-Utah border
 OKKAMO Tri-State Marker: monument on the Arkansas-Missouri-Oklahoma tripoint
 Texhomex: monument on the New Mexico-Oklahoma-Texas tripoint

External links

 Preston Monument
 David Mark's homepage
 Simpson Family website "Oklahoma Tripoints"

References

Buildings and structures in Baca County, Colorado
Borders of Colorado
Borders of New Mexico
Borders of Oklahoma
Buildings and structures in Cimarron County, Oklahoma
Geography of Union County, New Mexico
Border tripoints
Buildings and structures in Union County, New Mexico
Monuments and memorials in New Mexico
Monuments and memorials in Colorado
Monuments and memorials in Oklahoma
Geography of Baca County, Colorado
Boundary markers